Capoetobrama kuschakewitschi is a cyprinid fish that is found in Central Asia, in a region shared by Kazakhstan, Kyrgyzstan, Tajikistan, Turkmenistan and Uzbekistan. It is the only member of its genus. There are two recognized subspecies.

Subspecies
 Capoetobrama kuschakewitschi kuschakewitschi (Kessler, 1872) (Sharpray)
 Capoetobrama kuschakewitschi orientalis A. M. Nikolskii, 1934 (Chu sharpray)

References

Cyprinid fish of Asia
Taxa named by Lev Berg
Monotypic cyprinid fish genera

Endangered fish